Podlipa may refer to the following places in Slovenia:

 Podlipa, Krško
 Podlipa, Vrhnika
 Podlipa, Žužemberk